Martin Lang (born 14 June 1968 in Saarbrücken) is a German slalom canoeist who competed from the mid-1980s to the early 2000s. He won four medals at the ICF Canoe Slalom World Championships with three golds (C1: 1991, 1993; C1 team: 1995) and a silver (C1 team: 1999).

Lang also competed in two Summer Olympics, earning his best finish of sixth in the C1 event at Barcelona in 1992.

He won the overall World Cup title in the C1 category in 1992. He also earned three medals at the European Championships (1 gold, 1 silver and 1 bronze).

World Cup individual podiums

References

1968 births
Canoeists at the 1992 Summer Olympics
Canoeists at the 1996 Summer Olympics
German male canoeists
Living people
Olympic canoeists of Germany
Medalists at the ICF Canoe Slalom World Championships
Sportspeople from Saarbrücken